Valea Iepei River may refer to:
 Valea Iepei, a tributary of the Gilort in Dolj and Gorj Counties, Romania
 Valea Iepei, a tributary of the Tisza in Maramureș County, Romania